The American snail-eater (Dipsas articulata) is a non-venomous snake found in Nicaragua, Costa Rica and Panama.

References

Dipsas
Snakes of North America
Reptiles of Nicaragua
Reptiles of Costa Rica
Reptiles of Panama
Reptiles described in 1868
Taxa named by Edward Drinker Cope